Beamont is an English surname, a variant of "Beaumont". Notable people with this surname include the following:

Roland Beamont (1920–2001), British fighter and test pilot
William Beamont (1797–1889), British solicitor and philanthropist
William John Beamont (1828–1868), English clergyman

English-language surnames